Charles Sherman Haight Jr. (born September 23, 1930) is an American lawyer and a senior United States district judge of the United States District Court for the Southern District of New York, who has sat by designation in the District of Connecticut since he took senior status.

Education and career

Born in New York City, New York, Haight graduated from Yale University in 1952, where he was a member of Skull and Bones, with a Bachelor of Arts degree and entered Yale Law School the following year, graduating in 1955 with a Bachelor of Laws. Haight gained admission to the New York State bar and in the same year joined the Admiralty and Shipping Department of the Department of Justice as a district court trial attorney. Haight got this job on recommendation from his father Charles Sherman Haight Sr., who was heavily involved in shipping affairs. He left the United States Department of Justice in 1957 to join his father at Haight, Gardner, Poor & Havens as an associate. Haight became a partner of the firm on the death of his father in 1968 and continued the practice of law with them until 1976.

Federal judicial service

Haight was nominated by President Gerald Ford on March 2, 1976, to a seat on the United States District Court for the Southern District of New York vacated by Judge Murray Gurfein. He was confirmed by the United States Senate on March 26, 1976, and received his commission on March 29, 1976. He assumed senior status on September 23, 1995. Since assuming senior status, he has sat by designation with the United States District Court for the District of Connecticut.

Notable cases

Haight put Mutulu Shakur in prison for his involvement in a 1981 bank robbery that led to three deaths.  In 2020, he denied him compassionate release despite Shakur's terminal cancer and record as a prisoner and mentor. Haight told Shakur — the stepfather of rapper Tupac Shakur — that he was not sick enough.  He told Shakur to come back when he was closer to death.

One of Haight's earliest decisions involved an act aimed at protection of the young. In May 1976, Haight passed a restraining order blocking a law that would disallow people under the age of twenty-one who are not living with a guardian from claiming benefits without first obtaining a potentially lengthy Family Court order.

Early the following year, Haight made an unusual provision, when he sentenced John G. Stoessinger, a United Nations official, to teaching prison inmates for failing to report fraud in excess of $260,000. Haight continued to preside over high-profile cases, including fraud relating to investors at Morgan & Stanley Co. and Lehman Brothers, Kuhn Loeb, Inc. in 1982, insider trading at Dean Witter Reynolds in 1984, police surveillance in 1989, and fraud relating to Contel in 1990.

In senior status, a case that spanned from 2002 to 2003 reduced restrictions in police surveillance, which he had imposed himself in 1985 under the Handschu guidelines, even when there is no evidence of criminal offence. Since March 2007, Haight has revisited his 2003 order, which was made in the antiterrorism climate after 9/11.

Other service

Haight was a director of the Kennedy Child Study Center; advisory trustee of the American-Scandinavian Foundation (Chairman, 1970–1976); manager of the Havens Fund; member of the Journal of Maritime Law and Commerce's editorial board; and a White House Fellow (1991–92).

See also
 List of United States federal judges by longevity of service

References

Sources
 

1930 births
Living people
American jurists
Lawyers from New York City
Yale Law School alumni
Judges of the United States District Court for the Southern District of New York
United States district court judges appointed by Gerald Ford
20th-century American judges
United States Department of Justice lawyers
21st-century American judges